Lars-Erik "Taxen" Sjöberg (4 May 1944 – 20 October 1987) was a Swedish ice hockey defenceman.  He played in Sweden from 1962 to 1974 (Leksands IF 1962–65 and 1967–69, Djurgårdens IF Hockey 1965–67, and Västra Frölunda IF 1969–74), and in North America for the Winnipeg Jets in the WHA and NHL from 1974 to 80.

Sjöberg won the Golden Puck as the Swedish player of the Year in 1968–69 and was named best defenceman at the 1974 World Ice Hockey Championships.  He was the first non-North American born and raised captain in the NHL, wearing the "C" for the Winnipeg Jets during their first season in the NHL. He was nicknamed "The Professor" and "The Little General" while playing for the Jets. Sjöberg captained the Swedish national team at the 1976 Canada Cup.

Sjöberg was working as a scout for the New York Rangers when he died of cancer in 1987. To honour him the Rangers each year gives out the Lars-Erik Sjöberg Award to the best rookie in the training camp.

Career statistics

Regular season and playoffs

International

Awards and achievements
Swedish Player of the Year (1969)
World Championship All-Star Team (1974)
Named Best Defenseman at World Championship (1974)
Played in the Canada Cup (1976)
Avco Cup (WHA) Championships (1976, 1978, 1979)
WHA First All-Star Team (1978)
Dennis A. Murphy Trophy Winner (1978)
"Honoured Member" of the Manitoba Hockey Hall of Fame
Inaugural member of the World Hockey Association Hall of Fame

References

External links

1944 births
1987 deaths
Djurgårdens IF Hockey players
Swedish expatriate ice hockey players in Canada
Frölunda HC players
Ice hockey players at the 1968 Winter Olympics
Ice hockey players at the 1972 Winter Olympics
Leksands IF players
New York Rangers scouts
Olympic ice hockey players of Sweden
People from Falun
Swedish expatriates in Canada
Swedish ice hockey defencemen
Winnipeg Jets (1972–1996) captains
Winnipeg Jets (1979–1996) players
Winnipeg Jets (WHA) players
Sportspeople from Dalarna County